In the 2007 French Open tennis tournament, the boys' singles competition was won by Uladzimir Ignatik of Belarus.

Seeds

Draw

Final eight

Top half

Section 1

Section 2

Bottom half

Section 3

Section 4

External links
 Draw

Boys Singles
2007